The Cleveland, Tennessee Metropolitan Statistical Area, as defined by the United States Census Bureau, is an area consisting of two counties in southeast Tennessee – Bradley and Polk – anchored by the city of Cleveland.  As of the 2020 United States census, the MSA had a population of 126,164. The MSA is also part of the Chattanooga Combined Statistical Area. The MSA was first designated in June 2003. Geographically, this metropolitan area is mostly coexistant with the Ocoee Region, a historical and cultural name that reflects the heritage of the area.

Counties
Bradley
Polk

Communities
Places with more than 40,000 inhabitants
Cleveland (Principal city)
Places with 1,000 to 10,000 inhabitants
Benton
East Cleveland
Hopewell
South Cleveland
Wildwood Lake
Places with fewer than 1,000 inhabitants
Charleston
Copperhill
Ducktown
Unincorporated places
Conasauga
Delano
Farner
Georgetown (partial)
Harbuck
Hopewell Estates
Misty Ridge
Ocoee
Old Fort
Parksville
Prospect
Reliance
Tasso
Turtletown
Waterville

Demographics
As of the census of 2010, there were 115,788 people, 44,600 households, and 31,622 families residing in the metropolitan area. The racial makeup of the MSA was 92.89% White, 3.69% African American, 0.34% Native American, 0.76% Asian, 0.05% Pacific Islander, and 1.42% from two or more races.

As of the census of 2000, there were 104,015 people, 40,729 households, and 29,400 families residing within the MSA. The racial makeup of the MSA was 93.81% White, 3.40% African American, 0.28% Native American, 0.50% Asian, 0.02% Pacific Islander, 0.77% from other races, and 1.23% from two or more races. Hispanic or Latino of any race were 1.86% of the population.

The median income for a household in the MSA was $32,339, and the median income for a family was $39,075. Males had a median income of $29,179 versus $21,209 for females. The per capita income for the MSA was $17,067.

Combined Statistical Area
The Chattanooga-Cleveland-Athens, TN-GA Combined Statistical Area is made up of six counties in southeast Tennessee and three counties in northwest Georgia. The statistical area includes the Cleveland Metropolitan Statistical Area, Chattanooga Metropolitan Statistical Area, and the Athens Micropolitan Statistical Area.

Transportation
Interstate 75, U.S. Route 11, U.S. Route 64, U.S. Route 74, and S.R. 60 pass through Cleveland and Bradley County. U.S. 64 and 74 also serve Ocoee, Ducktown, and Copperhill. U.S. 11 also serves Charleston and McDonald. U.S. Route 411 runs north and south through Polk county and serves Benton and Ocoee. S.R. 68 runs through eastern Polk county and serves Copperhill and Ducktown.

Major roadways

 Interstate 75
 U.S. Route 11
 U.S. Route 64
 U.S. Route 74
 U.S. Route 11 Bypass
 U.S. Route 64 Bypass
 U.S. Route 411
 S.R. 30
 S.R. 40
 S.R. 60
 S.R. 68
 S.R. 74
 S.R. 123
 S.R. 163
 S.R. 306
 S.R. 308
 S.R. 312
 S.R. 313
 S.R. 314
 S.R. 315 
 S.R. 317

See also
Tennessee census statistical areas
List of cities and towns in Tennessee

References

 
Geography of Bradley County, Tennessee
Geography of Polk County, Tennessee
East Tennessee